Oktyabrsky District is an administrative and municipal district (raion), one of the thirty-five in Orenburg Oblast, Russia. It is located in the center of the oblast and borders Kuyurgazinsky District of the Republic of Bashkortostan and Sharlyksky District in the north, Tyulgansky District in the east, Sakmarsky District in the south, and Alexandrovsky and Perevolotsky Districts in the west. Its administrative center is the rural locality (a selo) of Oktyabrskoye. As of the 2010 Census, the total population of the district was 20,018, with the population of Oktyabrskoye accounting for 38.5% of that number.

History
Kashirinsky District was established on May 30, 1927, when Orenburg Governorate was divided into districts. In 1935, the district was given its present name. On January 12, 1965, Belozersky District was merged into Oktyabrsky District, thus establishing it in its modern borders.

References

Notes

Sources

Districts of Orenburg Oblast
States and territories established in 1927
